Faris Abdalla Mamoun Sawedy (born 19 February 1994) is a Sudanese professional footballer who plays as a defender.

Honours

Clubs
Al-Ahly Shendi
Sudan Cup
Winners (1) :2017
Al-Hilal Club
Sudan Premier League
Champions (2) :2020-21, 2021-22
Sudan Cup (1) :2021-22

International goals

References

External links 
 
 

1994 births
Living people
Sudanese footballers
Sudan international footballers
Al-Hilal Club (Omdurman) players
Association football defenders
Sudan Premier League players